Jean Marie de Bourbon, Duke of Châteauvillain (17 July 1748 – 19 May 1755) was a French Duke and nobleman. He died in Paris at the age of 6. He was the duc de Châteauvillain from birth.

Biography
Jean Marie was born in Paris at the Hôtel de Toulouse, Parisian townhouse of the fabulously wealthy Duke of Penthièvre. Penthièvre was the only legitimate son of Louis Alexandre de Bourbon, Count of Toulouse and in turn the illegitimate son of Louis XIV of France and Madame de Montespan.

His mother Princess Maria Teresa d'Este, was also a descendant of Louis XIV and Montespan, her mother Charlotte Aglaé d'Orléans being their grand daughter and child of Philippe d'Orléans, Régent of France. Jean Marie was created duc de Châteauvillain at his birth, one of the many titles his father possessed. At the time of his birth in 1748, his parents, who were devoted to each other, already had two other sons, Louis Marie born in 1746 and the Prince of Lamballe. At the early death of Louis Jean in 1749, Lamballe became the heir of one of the largest fortunes in Europe.

As a prince of the Blood (Prince du Sang), Jean Marie was allowed the style of Serene Highness and was one of the most important males at court after the King, the Dauphin, the Dukes of Orléans, Chartres, Montpensier, his own father and older brother Lamballe.

His mother died in 1754 in childbirth bringing Louis Marie Félicité into the world. Louis Marie himself would die sometime after birth. Jean Marie's father never married again. The next year Jean Marie himself would die in Paris. Buried at the Chapel at the Château de Rambouillet, his fathers favourite residence. His sister Louise Marie Adélaïde de Bourbon, future Duchess of Orléans would move Jean Marie's body to the Royal Chapel, Dreux; Dreux is today the burial site of the Royal House of Orléans which descends from Marie Adélaïde and her husband, Philippe Égalité. The painting of Jean Marie by Louis Michel van Loo is today held at the Musée national du Château de Versailles.

Ancestry

References and notes

1748 births
1755 deaths
Nobility from Paris
Burials at the Chapelle royale de Dreux
Jean Marie
Dukes of Châteauvillain
Royal reburials
Royalty and nobility who died as children